Eino Kirjonen (25 February 1933, in Koivisto – 21 August 1988, in Kouvola) was a Finnish ski jumper who competed from 1954 to 1962. He finished seventh in the individual large hill event at the 1956 Winter Olympics in Cortina d'Ampezzo.

Kirjonen earned a total of three career victories, all in normal hill events (1955, 1957, 1961). He also won the Four Hills Tournament event in 1961-62.

References

References

1933 births
1988 deaths
People from Primorsk, Leningrad Oblast
Olympic ski jumpers of Finland
Ski jumpers at the 1956 Winter Olympics
Ski jumpers at the 1960 Winter Olympics
Finnish male ski jumpers
20th-century Finnish people